Gary Culling (born 6 April 1972) is an English former footballer who played in the Football League as a defender for Colchester United.

Career

Culling, born in Braintree joined Colchester United briefly in 1994 from his hometown club Braintree Town. He made two appearances in the Football League for the U's, making his debut in the opening game of the 1994–95 season, a 3–1 home defeat to Torquay United. His final game came one week later in a 2–0 away defeat to Mansfield Town. He also started in a 2–0 League Cup defeat to Brentford between his two league appearances. Culling returned to Braintree Town after leaving Colchester.

References

1972 births
Living people
People from Braintree, Essex
English footballers
Association football defenders
Braintree Town F.C. players
Colchester United F.C. players
English Football League players